The thick-thumbed myotis (Myotis rosseti) is a species of vesper bat. It can be found in Cambodia, Laos, and Thailand.

References

Mouse-eared bats
Taxonomy articles created by Polbot
Mammals described in 1951